In 1986–87, a military standoff took place between India and China in the Sumdorong Chu Valley bordering the Tawang district, Arunachal Pradesh and Cona County, Tibet. It was initiated by China moving a company of troops to Wangdung, a pasture to the south of Sumdorong Chu that India believed to be its territory. The Indian troops stood their ground on the neighbouring Longro La ridge and both the sides moved a large number of troops to the border. The crisis was diffused after the visit of Indian External Affairs minister to Beijing in May 1987. The standoff  gave rise to fears of escalation. Subsequently, India and China formulated agreements for managing future border tensions.

Background
Since 1962, India had not returned to the site of its major defeat at Namka Chu, an east–west running stream which separates the Thag La ridge to the north and the Hathung La ridge to its south. India's efforts to occupy the Thag La ridge was the casus belli for the October 1962 Chinese military attack on India.  

Because there were no other feasible defensive locations north of Tawang, the Indian government had more or less decided that in the event of a new war, they would abandon the Tawang town and prepare for battle at the Se La pass to its south. However, after a 1980 review, it was decided by the military strategists that it was important to defend Tawang in a future conflict. The army made it clear that the only viable line of defence for Tawang would be along the Hathung La ridge. 

In 1983, an Intelligence Bureau team went to the pasturage of Sumdorong Chu which is north-east of the confluence of the Namka Chu and Nyamjiang Chu. The intelligence team stayed through the summer and returned in winter. This procedure was followed for two years. In 1986, the Indian team found that the Chinese had preceded them and set up semi-permanent structures there and were not willing to budge.

Under the orders of General Sundarji and codenamed Operation Falcon, the Indians undertook an airlift of troops and vehicles to Zemithang from 18 to 20 October 1986. Taking up locations on multiple heights, including the Hathung La ridge, Indian troops were able to strategically occupy the high ground near Sumdorong Chu. This was followed by more mobilisation by both sides. China called for a flag meeting on 15 November. The standoff continued until May 1987.

Political context
At the end of 1986, India granted statehood to Arunachal Pradesh. The Chinese government proceeded to protest. But the military movements in Tawang, taken in conjunction with this political action were seen as a provocation by the Chinese. In early 1987 Beijing's tone became similar to that of 1962, and with the Indian Army refusing to stand down, Western diplomats predicted war.

The result was a thaw. Indian Foreign Minister N.D. Tiwari arrived in Beijing in May 1987 en route to Pyongyang, North Korea. He carried with him messages from Indian leaders that there was no intention on New Delhi's part to aggravate the situation. The first formal flag meeting to discuss “ the freezing of the situation” since 1962, was held on the fifth of August 1987 at Bum La in the aftermath of the Wangdung affair. Both sides decided to take up talks with renewed urgency and the following year in 1988, Rajiv Gandhi visited Beijing, returning Zhou Enlai's '60s visit.

Operation Chequerboard
Operation Chequerboard (or Checker Board) was a high-altitude military exercise conducted by India along the Chinese border in North East India during the spring of 1987, in the midst of the Sumdorong Chu standoff. The exercise was conducted to test Indian military response in the Northeast Himalayan region and the US and Soviet reaction to potential Sino-Indian tensions in the region.  Scholar Manjeet Pardesi states that it was unclear whether the operation involved mere simulations or also field exercises. However it did serve the purpose of demonstrating to China the Indian resolve and its military preparedness.

The exercise involved 10 divisions of the Indian Army and several squadrons of the IAF and a redeployment of troops at several places in North East India. The Indian Army moved 3 divisions to positions around Wangdung, where they were supplied and maintained solely by air. These troop reinforcements were over and above the 50,000 troops already present across Arunachal Pradesh. The military exercise coincided with statements from India's Chief of Army Staff Krishnaswamy Sundarji that India recognizes the major boundary differences with China and Indian deployments are intended to give Beijing the benefit of the doubt.

General Vishwa Nath Sharma has said that Operation Chequerboard was nothing but only a telecom and headquarters exercise and that Sundarji didn't move any brigades and there was nothing on the ground. He further said that it was separately run by the Eastern Command.

Aftermath
Both India and China realised the danger of an inadvertent conflict and, after initial posturing, a decision was made to de-escalate their deployments. The fallout from the standoff resulted in India and China restarting dialogue, which had been dormant since the 1962 war. After Rajiv Gandhi's 1988 visit, there was a hiatus of sorts because of political turmoil in India. But finally in 1993, the two countries signed an agreement to ensure peace along the LAC.

The agreement brought in an interesting concept of "mutual and equal security" where thinning of forces was envisaged, based on geographical and logistical considerations. However, its most important element was to have the two sides work out a mutually acceptable Line of Actual Control. As of now, the two sides have their own versions of the line and there are points, especially in the Sikkim-Bhutan-India trijunction, the Sumdorong Chu area and so on, where each other's claims continue to be disputed.

See also
Sino-Indian border dispute
Sino-Indian War
 Sino-Indian border clashes and standoffs: 1967, 2013, 2017, 2020

Notes

References

Bibliography

Further reading
 
 Arjun Subramaniam, For Operation Falcon, Maj Gen Jimmy asked for mules but Army chief Sundarji gave helicopters, The Print, 15 May 2020.
 Sushant Singh, Army HQ wanted me to withdraw from Wangdung in 1987 but I refused: Retired General VN Sharma, The Caravan, 22 September 2020.

External links
 1987中印边境冲突：印军最后时刻撤销攻击令 (1987 Sino-Indian skirmish military conflicts)  , Qianlong Military, 2 November 2009.
 Wangdung pasture mapped on OpenTopoMap. Retrieved 26 October 2020.
 Ram Naidu, Border with China, The Hindu (letter to the editor), 22 November 2000.

Conflicts in 1987
Sino-Indian Skirmish, 1987
1987 in China
Wars involving the People's Republic of China
Wars involving India
1987 Sino Indian skirmish
Battles and conflicts without fatalities
Rajiv Gandhi administration